Depce is a village located in the municipality of Preševo, Serbia. According to the 2002 census, the village has a population of 441 people. Of these, 423 (95,91 %) were ethnic Albanians, and 17 (3,85 %) others.

References

Populated places in Pčinja District
Albanian communities in Serbia